List of notable events in music that took place in the year 1974.



Specific locations
1974 in British music
1974 in Norwegian music

Specific genres
1974 in country music
1974 in heavy metal music
1974 in jazz

Events

January–April
January 1 – English jazz musician John Dankworth is named CBE in the United Kingdom's New Year's Honours List.
January 3 – Bob Dylan and The Band begin their 40-date concert tour at Chicago Stadium. It is Dylan's first tour since 1966.
January 17
Joni Mitchell releases her album Court and Spark, supported by the single "Help Me".
Dino Martin, singer and son of Dean Martin, is arrested on suspicion of possession and sale of two machine guns.
February 12 – New York's rock club The Bottom Line opens in Greenwich Village. The first headlining act is Dr. John.
February 14 – The Captain & Tennille are married in Virginia City, Nevada.
February 16 – Two years of litigation between Grand Funk and former manager Terry Knight are finally resolved. The band gets the rights to its name but Knight wins a cash settlement.
February 18
Yes sells out the first of two nights at Madison Square Garden, without any advertising for the show.
Kiss release their self-titled debut album.
February 19 – The first American Music Awards are broadcast on ABC, two weeks before the Grammys. Helen Reddy and Jim Croce are among the winners.
February 20 – Cher files for divorce from her husband of 10 years, Sonny Bono.
February 22 – The English Chamber Orchestra conducted by Raymond Leppard performs the world premiere of Three Regions from Terrain by Douglas Young.
February 27 – The Württemberg Chamber Orchestra Heilbronn, conducted by Jörg Faerber, makes its English debut at the Queen Elizabeth Hall, London.
March 1 – Rush release their self-titled debut album.
March 2 – The 16th Annual Grammy Awards are presented in Los Angeles, hosted by Andy Williams. Stevie Wonder's Innervisions wins Album of the Year, while Roberta Flack's version of "Killing Me Softly With His Song" wins both Record of the Year and Song of the Year. Bette Midler wins Best New Artist.
March 3
Elvis Presley played two shows at the Houston Astrodome, breaking attendance records with 44,000 at the evening show.
March 4
Ivan Stepanov and His Balalaikas make their London debut at the Wigmore Hall.
Baritone Hermann Prey cuts short a vocal recital in the Royal Festival Hall, London, due to vocal fatigue.
March 10 – Hans Vonk makes his London debut in the Royal Festival Hall, conducting the Royal Philharmonic Orchestra in a programme of Berlioz and Schubert, as well as the Violin Concerto by Roberto Gerhard, with Erich Gruenberg as soloist.
March 12 – John Lennon is involved in an altercation with a photographer outside The Troubadour in Los Angeles. Lennon and friend Harry Nilsson have been heckling comedian Tommy Smothers and are forced to leave the club.
March 16 – Country music's Grand Ole Opry moves to a new location at the Opryland USA theme park in Nashville, Tennessee
March 30 – The Ramones play their first concert at the Performance Studio in New York.
March 31 – Record producer Phil Spector is badly injured in a car accident in Hollywood, details of which are largely suppressed at the time.
April 5 – Van Halen play their first show on the Sunset Strip in Hollywood at Gazzarri's.
April 6
200,000 music fans attend The California Jam rock festival. Artists performing at the event include Emerson, Lake & Palmer, Black Sabbath, Deep Purple, Black Oak Arkansas and the Eagles.
Swedish group ABBA wins the 19th Eurovision Song Contest in The Dome, Brighton, England, with the song "Waterloo", kickstarting their international career. The 1967 Eurovision winner, Sandie Shaw, attends.
April 14 – Ladies and Gentlemen: The Rolling Stones, a concert film made during the Rolling Stones' 1972 North American Tour, premieres at the Ziegfeld Theatre in New York.
April 16 – Queen play their first North American concert, opening for Mott the Hoople in Denver, Colorado.
April 24–25 – Music aired on the radio in Portugal acts as a secret signal to trigger the Carnation Revolution there: at 10:55 p.m. on April 24, Paulo de Carvalho's "E Depois do Adeus" (Portugal's entry in the 1974 Eurovision Song Contest) on Emissores Associados de Lisboa alerts rebel captains and soldiers that the coup is beginning; at 12:20 a.m. on April 25, Rádio Renascença broadcasts "Grândola, Vila Morena", a song by José Afonso, an influential political folk singer-songwriter, signalling the Armed Forces Movement (MFA) to begin the takeover of strategic points of power in the country from 3.00 a.m.
April 25
Sotheby's Galleries in London sell a violin made in 1733 by Cremonese master Giuseppe Guarneri, formerly belonging to violinist Elaine Weldon, for the equivalent of $140,000, the second-highest price ever paid for a violin.
Pam Morrison, Jim Morrison's widow, is found dead in her Hollywood apartment from an apparent heroin overdose.

May–December
May 7 – Led Zeppelin announces their new record label, Swan Song Records, with a lavish party at The Four Seasons Hotel in New York.
May 11 – The New York Police bagpipe band performs shortly after midnight at the Portsmouth, RI Ramada Inn, in connection with a National Police Week event, prompting a drunken spree lasting until dawn by at least a dozen off-duty members of the Boston Police Department. The officers ran naked through the motel, "smashing chairs and tables, soiling rugs, discharging fire extinguishers, exploding firecrackers, setting off a burglar alarm, disconnecting a security camera, slashing automobile tires and throwing pictures into the motel courtyard", causing an estimated $1027.75 in damage, including liquor stolen from a locked cabinet and unpaid breakfast bills.
May 25 – Twenty years after it was recorded, "Rock Around the Clock" by Bill Haley and His Comets returns to the Billboard top 40, after it gains renewed popularity from its use in the film American Graffiti and the TV series Happy Days.
May 28 – Experimental orchestra, the Portsmouth Sinfonia, plays a concert at the Royal Albert Hall, with its regular conductor John Farley.  The performers included Michael Nyman and Brian Eno. 
June 1 – Kevin Ayers, John Cale, Brian Eno, Nico and other musicians perform at the Rainbow Theatre in London. The performances are later released as June 1, 1974.
June 5 
Sly Stone married model-actress Kathy Silva on June 5, 1974, during a sold-out performance at Madison Square Garden.
Patti Smith records "Hey Joe", her debut single, which arguably becomes the first punk rock single when released in August.
June 14 – David Bowie launches his Diamond Dogs tour at the Montreal Forum. One year previously he had announced that he was retiring from touring as Ziggy Stardust.
July 4 – Barry White marries Love Unlimited lead singer Glodean James.
July 19–21 – Ozark Music Festival is held in Sedalia, Missouri, with a crowd estimated between 100,000 and 350,000 people.
July 20 – The first Knebworth Concert is held in England, headlined by The Allman Brothers Band.
July 29 
Having performed at two sold-out concerts at the London Palladium, "Mama" Cass Elliot dies in her sleep after suffering a heart attack in a Mayfair flat in London, aged 32.
Neil Peart officially joins Rush.
August 6 – Hugh MacCallum, of Stirling, wins the silver chanter for the third time, playing "Mrs MacLeod of Callisker's Salute" at the invitational bagpipe competition held at Dunvegan Castle on the Isle of Skye. Second place was given to the previous year's winner, Donald Morrison from South Uist, who performed "Rory MacLeod's Lament". 
August 7 
During a performance of Carmina Burana, conducted by André Previn, at The Proms, soloist Thomas Allen collapses because of the heat and eventually has to be carried out by members of the orchestra. Prommer Patrick McCarthy, just embarking on his professional singing career, offers his services as a replacement and completes the performance.
Peter Wolf, lead singer of The J. Geils Band, marries actress Faye Dunaway.
August 16 – Ramones' first appearance on NYC's venue CBGB. The venue would help establish their place at the forefront of punk rock.
September 15 – Gary Thain of Uriah Heep is shocked on stage at the Moody Coliseum in Dallas, Texas, and is seriously injured.
October 3 – Idi Amin, the President of Uganda, instructs his country's acting high commissioner in London to recruit two six-foot-tall Scots bagpipers with military backgrounds to serve as his bodyguards.
October 5
AC/DC performs its first official show with Bon Scott as its new lead singer.
The North Coast Band Invitational competition, sponsored by St. Ann's CYO Band of Neponset, is held for the first time, at Nickerson Field on the Boston University campus.
October 18 – Al Green is attacked while bathing by a girlfriend of several weeks, Mrs. Mary Woodson, a 29-year-old mother of three. She scalds his body with a pan of boiling grits and commits suicide a few moments later, reportedly because he rejected her marriage proposal.
November 2 – George Harrison launches his "George Harrison & Friends North American Tour" in Vancouver. It is the first North American tour by a former Beatle since the band's August 1966 tour.
November 21 – Wilson Pickett is arrested in Andes, New York, after allegedly firing a bullet through the door of a hotel room where he was staying while on a hunting trip with The Isley Brothers.
November 28 – John Lennon joins Elton John on stage at Madison Square Garden for three songs. 
December 12 – Mick Taylor leaves The Rolling Stones after six years.
December 31
Lindsey Buckingham and Stevie Nicks join Fleetwood Mac.
The third annual New Year's Rockin' Eve, moving this year from NBC to ABC, is aired with performances by Herbie Hancock, The Beach Boys, Chicago, Olivia Newton-John and The Doobie Brothers.

unknown date
Lord Shorty's Endless Vibrations is the first soca LP and the first major soca hit worldwide.
Eric Bogle's "And the Band Played Waltzing Matilda" comes to prominence when he enters it in a National Folk Festival songwriting competition in Brisbane, Australia.
Rover Thomas claims to have been visited in a dream by a deceased friend near Warmun, Australia, and receives the Krill Krill song cycle.
The original Alice Cooper group breaks up. The band's leader, Vincent Furnier, changes his name to Alice Cooper and goes on to a solo career.
Journey signs to Columbia Records.
Roland RE-201 and 101 Space Echo tape-based audio delay effects units introduced.

Bands formed
See :Category:Musical groups established in 1974

Bands disbanded
The Moody Blues (reformed in 1977)
The Stooges (reformed in 2003)
King Crimson (reformed in 1981)

Albums released

January

February

March

April

May

June

July

August

September

October

November

December

Release date unknown

Alvorecer – Clara Nunes
Andy Kim – Andy Kim
Baker Gurvitz Army – Baker Gurvitz Army
Banquet – Lucifer's Friend
Blackdance – Klaus Schulze
Breakin' Bread – Fred & the New J.B.'s
Cassidy Live! – David Cassidy
Caught Up – Millie Jackson
Child of the Novelty – Mahogany Rush
The Civil Surface – Egg
Come a Little Closer – Etta James
Damn Right I Am Somebody – Fred Wesley The J.B.'s
Dancehall Sweethearts – Horslips
Dandruff – Ivor Cutler
David Essex – David Essex
Don't Be Fooled by the Name – Geordie
Elis & Tom – Elis Regina & Tom Jobim
Ella in London – Ella Fitzgerald
Five-A-Side – Ace
Floating World – Jade Warrior
The Giants – Oscar Peterson, Joe Pass, Ray Brown
Greatest Hits – David Cassidy
Gregg Allman Tour – Gregg Allman – Live
Having Fun with Elvis on Stage – Elvis Presley 
Hot Wire – Trapeze
I Can't Stand the Rain – Ann Peebles
Introducing Eddy and the Falcons – Wizzard
I Wanna Get Funky – Albert King
Journey – Colin Blunstone
The Link Wray Rumble – Link Wray
L'isola di niente – Premiata Forneria Marconi

Live! – April Wine
Live – The Dubliners
Love Me for a Reason – The Osmonds
The Main Event – Live – Frank Sinatra
Manifiesto – Víctor Jara
Manuel – Dalida
Men Opening Umbrellas Ahead – Vivian Stanshall
Mo' Roots - Taj Mahal
Olympia 74 – Dalida
Orleans II – Orleans
Oscar Peterson in Russia – Oscar Peterson
Oscar Peterson and Dizzy Gillespie – Oscar Peterson, Dizzy Gillespie
Oscar Peterson and the Trumpet Kings – Jousts – Oscar Peterson
Oscar Peterson and Roy Eldridge – Oscar Peterson, Roy Eldridge
Oscar Peterson and Harry Edison – Oscar Peterson, Harry "Sweets" Edison
Phases and Stages – Willie Nelson
Rocking Time - Burning Spear
Riding High – Chilliwack 
Rub It In – Billy "Crash" Craddock
Satch and Josh – Oscar Peterson, Count Basie
Solid – The Groundhogs
Something to Say – Buster Brown
Tasty – Good Rats
They Say I'm Different – Betty Davis
The Way We Were – Andy Williams
What the....You Mean I Can't Sing?! – Melvin van Peebles
Where Have I Known You Before – Return to Forever
The Whole Thing Started with Rock & Roll Now It's Out of Control – Ray Manzarek 
Way Down Yonder - Charlie Daniels
Windows – Jon Lord and Eberhard Schoener – Live
Windfall – Ricky Nelson & The Stone Canyon Band 
Zuckerzeit – Cluster

Biggest hit singles 
The following songs achieved the highest chart positions
in the charts of 1974.

Top 40 Chart hit singles

Other Chart hit singles

Notable singles

Other Notable singles
"Ake, Make, Pera ja mä" b/w "Perjantai on mielessäin" - Hector

Published popular music
 "Annie's Song" – w.m. John Denver
"Cat's in the Cradle" – Harry Chapin
 "Happy Days" – w.m. Pratt & McClain from the ABC-TV Series Happy Days
 "Hasta Mañana" – w.m. Benny Andersson, Stig Anderson & Björn Ulvaeus
 "I Honestly Love You" – w.m. Peter Allen & Jeff Barry
 "I Won't Send Roses" – w.m. Jerry Herman introduced by Robert Preston and reprised by Bernadette Peters in the musical Mack & Mabel
 "I've Got the Music in Me" – w.m. Bias Boshell
 "Midnight at the Oasis" – w.m. David Nichtern
 "Murder on the Orient Express" – m. Richard Rodney Bennett from the film Murder on the Orient Express
 "Freebird" – Lynyrd Skynyrd
 "No Goodbyes" – w.m. Richard M. Sherman & Robert B. Sherman from the musical Over Here!
 "Pencil Thin Mustache" – w.m. Jimmy Buffett
 "Ring Ring" – w.m. Benny Andersson, Stig Anderson, Björn Ulvaeus, Neil Sedaka & Phil Cody
 "She" – w. Herbert Kretzmer m. Charles Aznavour
 "Southern Nights" – w.m. Allen Toussaint
 "Sundown" – w.m. Gordon Lightfoot
 "Sunshine on My Shoulders" – w.m. John Denver, Richard Kniss & Michael Taylor
 "Tap Your Troubles Away" – w.m. Jerry Herman from the musical Mack & Mabel
 "Time Heals Everything" – w.m. Jerry Herman.  Introduced by Bernadette Peters in the musical Mack & Mabel
 "Waterloo" – w.m. Benny Andersson, Stig Anderson & Björn Ulvaeus
 "We May Never Love Like This Again" – w.m. Al Kasha & Joel Hirschorn.  From the film The Towering Inferno
 "Whatever Happened to Randolph Scott" – w.m. Don Reid
 "(You're) Having My Baby" – w.m. Paul Anka
 "Gigi L'Amoroso" – Dalida
 "Anima Mia" – Dalida
 "Ta Femme" – Dalida

Classical music

Anne Boyd – Angklung for piano
George Crumb – Music for a Summer Evening (Makrokosmos III) for two amplified pianos and percussion (two players).
Mario Davidovsky
Synchronisms No. 7, for orchestra and tape
Synchronisms No. 8, for woodwind quintet and tape
Einar Englund – Piano Concerto No. 2
Luc Ferrari
Petite symphonie intuitive pour une paysage de printemps
éphémère I,  for tape and undetermined instrumentation
Nicolas Flagello – The Passion of Martin Luther King (oratorio)
Joaquin Homs – Trio
Wojciech Kilar – Krzesany, for orchestra
György Ligeti – San Francisco Polyphony, for orchestra (1973–74)
Olivier Messiaen – Des canyons aux étoiles... for solo piano, solo horn, solo glockenspiel, solo xylorimba, small orchestra with 13 string players
Krzysztof Penderecki – The Dream of Jacob
Wolfgang Regel – Requiem "à la mémoire de César Geoffray"
Steve Reich – Music for 18 Musicians
Wolfgang Rihm
Dis-Kontur for orchestra
Hervorgedunkelt (text: Paul Celan), for mezzo-soprano, flute, harp, vibraphone, cello, organ, and percussion
Klavierstück Nr. 4
Siebengestalt, for organ and tam-tam
Alfred Schnittke
Symphony No. 1
Hymn I, for cello, harp and timpani
Hymn II, for cello and double-bass
Hymn III, for cello, bassoon, harpsichord and bells or timpani
Dmitri Shostakovich – String Quartet No. 15 in E-flat minor, Op. 144
Karlheinz Stockhausen – Inori: Adorations for One or Two Soloists with Orchestra

Opera
Robert Ashley – Music with Roots in the Aether
Friedrich Goldmann – R.Hot bzw. Die Hitze

Jazz

Musical theater
 Candide (Leonard Bernstein) – Broadway revival
 Cole London production opened at the Mermaid Theatre on July 2.  Cast included Julia McKenzie, Bill Kerr, Una Stubbs and Rod McLennan
 Gypsy (Jule Styne and Stephen Sondheim) – Broadway revival
 Hans Christian Andersen – London production
 Lorelei – Broadway production opened at the Palace Theatre and ran for 321 performances
 Mack and Mabel – Broadway production opened at the Majestic Theatre and ran for 66 performances
 The Magic Show – Off-Broadway production
 Over Here! – Broadway production opened at the Schubert Theatre and ran for 341 performances
 West Side Story (Bernstein) – London revival

Musical films
 Huckleberry Finn
 Mame
 Phantom of the Paradise
 That's Entertainment!
 Son of Dracula

Births
January 4 – Tricky Stewart, American record producer, musician and songwriter
January 6 – Wolfgang Dimetrik, Austrian accordionist
January 10 – Jemaine Clement, New Zealand bassist, guitarist, pianist and singer (Flight of the Conchords)
January 11 – Giuseppe Filianoti, Italian opera singer (tenor)
January 12 – Melanie C, English pop singer (Spice Girls)
January 18 – Gustavo Kupinski, Argentine guitarist (d. 2011) 
January 25 – Emily Haines, Canadian singer-songwriter
January 26 – Rokia Traoré, Malian singer-songwriter
February 11 – D'Angelo, American singer-songwriter, multi-instrumentalist and record producer
February 13 – Robbie Williams, British singer-songwriter
February 17
Bernt Moen, Norwegian pianist
Bryan White, American singer-songwriter and guitarist
February 24 – Chad Hugo, American multi-instrumentalist and record producer. (The Neptunes, N.E.R.D, Pharrell Williams)
March 9 – Deborah Lurie, American composer, arranger, and music producer
March 13 – Phil Burton, Australian singer (Human Nature)
April 11 
 David Jassy, Swedish musician, songwriter and music producer
 Alexander Kuoppala, Finnish guitarist  
April 12 – Belinda Emmett, Australian singer, musician and actress (d. 2006)
April 14 – Da Brat, American rapper and actress
April 17
Victoria Beckham, English businesswoman, fashion designer, model and singer (Spice Girls)
Mikael Åkerfeldt, Swedish musician (Opeth)
April 18 – Millie Corretjer, Puerto Rican singer and actress
April 20 – Tina Cousins, English singer-songwriter
April 21 – Faust, Norwegian drummer
April 26 
 Nerina Pallot, British singer, songwriter and producer
 Greg Laswell, American musician, recording engineer, and producer (Ingrid Michaelson)
May 1 – Kellie Crawford, Australian singer, dancer, actress and children's performer
May 2 - Matt Berry, an English actor, comedian, musician, and writer
May 6 – Patrick Tang, Hong Kong actor and singer
May 10 – Quentin Elias, French-Algerian singer and actor (Alliage) (d. 2014)
May 16 – Laura Pausini, Italian singer
May 17 – Andrea Corr, Irish singer (The Corrs)
May 18 – Chantal Kreviazuk, Canadian singer-songwriter
May 20 – Mikael Stanne, Swedish musician (Dark Tranquillity)
May 21 – Adriano Cintra, Brazilian multi-instrumentalist and producer (Cansei de Ser Sexy)
May 23 – Jewel, American singer-songwriter, poet and musician
May 30
CeeLo Green, American singer, rapper
Big L, freestyle rapper
June 1 – Alanis Morissette, Canadian singer-songwriter
June 7 – Cassius Khan, Canadian singer and tabla player
June 9 – Samoth, Norwegian musician
June 20 – Andrew Tierney, Australian singer (Human Nature)
June 24 
 Magnus Carlsson, Swedish singer
 Vinnie Fiorello, American drummer and songwriter (Less Than Jake)
July – Amanda Ghost, English singer-songwriter, record producer and music executive, president of Epic Records (2009–10) (Elle King, Beyoncé)
July 2 – Rocky Gray, American drummer, guitarist and songwriter (Evanescence, We Are the Fallen, Living Sacrifice and Soul Embraced)
July 3 – Corey Reynolds, American musical theatre, television, and film actor
July 7 – E.D.I. Mean, American rapper and producer (Outlawz)
July 9 – Nikola Sarcevic, Swedish singer and bassist (Millencolin)
July 11 
 Alanas Chošnau, Lithuanian singer and songwriter
 Lil' Kim, American rapper
July 12 – Sharon den Adel, Dutch singer
July 13 – Deborah Cox, Canadian R&B singer
July 16 – Jeremy Enigk, American singer/songwriter (Sunny Day Real Estate, The Fire Theft)
July 19 – Ramin Djawadi, Iranian-German composer
July 20 – Bonny B., Cambodian blues musician
July 21 – Terry Coldwell, singer (East 17)
July 22 
 Rell, soul singer
 Johnny Strong, American actor and musician
July 31 – Leona Naess, British singer-songwriter (Evan Ross, Diana Ross)
August 8
Preta Gil, Brazilian singer
Brian Harvey, British singer (East 17)
August 13 – Niklas Sundin, Swedish guitarist (Dark Tranquillity)
August 14 – Ana Matronic, American singer (Scissor Sisters)
August 17 – Salem Abraha, singer-songwriter
August 23 – Shifty Shellshock, American musician
August 30 – Aaron Barrett, lead singer and guitarist (Reel Big Fish)
September 4 – Carmit Bachar, American singer, dancer, model, actress and showgirl (Pussycat Dolls)
September 6 – Nina Persson, Swedish singer-songwriter (The Cardigans)  
September 19 – Jimmy Fallon, American comedian & musician
September 24
 Niels Brinck, Danish singer and songwriter 
 Kati Wolf, Hungarian singer
October 1 – Keith Duffy, Irish pop singer and actor
October 4 – Ramazan Kubat, Turkish folk singer and composer
October 5 – Heather Headley, Trinidadian-American singer, songwriter, record producer and actress
October 14 
Natalie Maines, American singer-songwriter 
Shaggy 2 Dope, American rapper and producer  
October 18 – Peter Svensson, Swedish guitarist (The Cardigans)
October 31 – Natasja Saad, Danish rapper and reggae singer (d. 2007)
November 2 – Nelly, American rapper
November 3 – Franko Božac, Croatian accordionist
November 4 – Louise Nurding, English singer, television personality and member of Eternal
 November 5 – Ryan Adams, American musician (Mandy Moore, Phoebe Bridgers, Leona Naess) 
November 14 – Chad Kroeger, Canadian singer-songwriter and musician 
December 3 – Trina, American rapper and musician 
December 7 – Nicole Appleton, Canadian television presenter, singer-songwriter and actress (All Saints)
December 10 – Meg White, American drummer and singer (The White Stripes)
December 15 - Acey Slade, American Musician 
December 24
 Julian Rachlin, Lithuanian-Austrian violinist
 Ryan Seacrest, American musical/entertainment television host, radio personality and producer

Deaths
January 2 – Tex Ritter, American country music singer, 68
January 23 – Lena Machado, Hawaiian singer, 70
January 30 – Olav Roots, Estonian pianist and composer, 63
February 2 – Jean Absil, organist and composer, 80
February 15 – Kurt Atterberg, composer, 86
February 28 – Bobby Bloom, singer-songwriter, 28
March 7 – Alberto Rabagliati, Italian singer and actor, 67
March 28
Dorothy Fields, lyricist, 68
Dino Ciani, pianist, 32 (road accident)
Arthur Crudup, singer, 68
April 5 – Jennifer Vyvyan, operatic soprano, 49 (bronchial condition)
April 7 – Pete Wendling, pianist and composer, 85
April 15 – Giovanni D'Anzi, Italian songwriter, 68
April 17 – Blossom Seeley, US singer and vaudeville entertainer, 87
April 25 – Pamela Courson, Jim Morrison's widow, 27 (heroin overdose)
May 8 – Graham Bond, R&B musician, 36 (hit by train)
May 15 – Paul Gonsalves, jazz saxophonist, 53
May 24 – Duke Ellington, jazz musician, and composer, 75
June 8 – Rodolfo Lipizer, violinist and conductor, 79
June 22 – Darius Milhaud, composer, 81
June 27 – Cliff Friend, US composer
July 18 – Gabrielle Ritter-Ciampi, operatic soprano, 77
July 27 – Lightnin' Slim, blues musician, 61
July 29 – "Mama" Cass Elliott, singer (The Mamas & the Papas), 32 (heart attack)
August 6 – Gene Ammons, tenor saxophonist, 49 (cancer)
August 9 – Bill Chase, jazz rock trumpeter, 39
August 11 – Maria Maksakova, Sr., opera singer, 72
September 3 – Harry Partch, composer, 73
September 22 – Marta Fuchs, operatic soprano, 76
September 23 – Robbie McIntosh, drummer (Average White Band), 24
October 5 – Ebe Stignani, operatic soprano, about 70
October 13 – Josef Krips, violinist, 72
October 24 – David Oistrakh, violinist, 66
November 5 – Marguerite Namara, operatic soprano, 85
November 8 – Ivory Joe Hunter, R&B singer, songwriter and pianist
November 9 – Egon Wellesz, Austrian composer, musicologist and teacher (emigrated to England), 89
November 11 – Alfonso Leng, composer, 80
November 19 – George Brunies, jazz musician, 72
November 21 – Frank Martin, composer, 84
November 25 – Nick Drake, singer/songwriter, 26 (overdose)

Awards

Grammy Awards
Grammy Awards of 1974

Country Music Association Awards

Eurovision Song Contest
Eurovision Song Contest 1974

References

 
20th century in music
Music by year